Lepidoptera of Albania consist of both the butterflies and moths recorded from Albania.

Butterflies

Hesperiidae
Carcharodus alceae (Esper, 1780)
Carcharodus floccifera (Zeller, 1847)
Carcharodus lavatherae (Esper, 1783)
Carcharodus orientalis Reverdin, 1913
Erynnis marloyi (Boisduval, 1834)
Erynnis tages (Linnaeus, 1758)
Gegenes nostrodamus (Fabricius, 1793)
Gegenes pumilio (Hoffmannsegg, 1804)
Hesperia comma (Linnaeus, 1758)
Ochlodes sylvanus (Esper, 1777)
Pyrgus alveus (Hübner, 1803)
Pyrgus armoricanus (Oberthür, 1910)
Pyrgus carthami (Hübner, 1813)
Pyrgus cinarae (Rambur, 1839)
Pyrgus malvae (Linnaeus, 1758)
Pyrgus serratulae (Rambur, 1839)
Pyrgus sidae (Esper, 1784)
Spialia orbifer (Hübner, 1823)
Spialia phlomidis (Herrich-Schäffer, 1845)
Thymelicus acteon (Rottemburg, 1775)
Thymelicus lineola (Ochsenheimer, 1808)
Thymelicus sylvestris (Poda, 1761)

Lycaenidae
Aricia agestis (Denis & Schiffermüller, 1775)
Aricia anteros (Freyer, 1838)
Aricia artaxerxes (Fabricius, 1793)
Callophrys rubi (Linnaeus, 1758)
Celastrina argiolus (Linnaeus, 1758)
Cupido alcetas (Hoffmannsegg, 1804)
Cupido argiades (Pallas, 1771)
Cupido decolorata (Staudinger, 1886)
Cupido minimus (Fuessly, 1775)
Cupido osiris (Meigen, 1829)
Cyaniris semiargus (Rottemburg, 1775)
Eumedonia eumedon (Esper, 1780)
Favonius quercus (Linnaeus, 1758)
Glaucopsyche alexis (Poda, 1761)
Iolana iolas (Ochsenheimer, 1816)
Kretania sephirus (Frivaldszky, 1835)
Lampides boeticus (Linnaeus, 1767)
Leptotes pirithous (Linnaeus, 1767)
Lycaena alciphron (Rottemburg, 1775)
Lycaena candens (Herrich-Schäffer, 1844)
Lycaena ottomanus (Lefebvre, 1830)
Lycaena phlaeas (Linnaeus, 1761)
Lycaena tityrus (Poda, 1761)
Lycaena virgaureae (Linnaeus, 1758)
Lysandra bellargus (Rottemburg, 1775)
Lysandra coridon (Poda, 1761)
Phengaris alcon (Denis & Schiffermüller, 1775)
Phengaris arion (Linnaeus, 1758)
Plebejus argus (Linnaeus, 1758)
Plebejus argyrognomon (Bergsträsser, 1779)
Polyommatus amandus (Schneider, 1792)
Polyommatus damon (Denis & Schiffermüller, 1775)
Polyommatus daphnis (Denis & Schiffermüller, 1775)
Polyommatus dorylas (Denis & Schiffermüller, 1775)
Polyommatus eros (Ochsenheimer, 1808)
Polyommatus icarus (Rottemburg, 1775)
Polyommatus ripartii (Freyer, 1830)
Pseudophilotes vicrama (Moore, 1865)
Satyrium acaciae (Fabricius, 1787)
Satyrium ilicis (Esper, 1779)
Satyrium spini (Denis & Schiffermüller, 1775)
Satyrium w-album (Knoch, 1782)
Scolitantides orion (Pallas, 1771)
Tarucus balkanica (Freyer, 1844)
Thecla betulae (Linnaeus, 1758)

Nymphalidae
Aglais io (Linnaeus, 1758)
Aglais urticae (Linnaeus, 1758)
Apatura ilia (Denis & Schiffermüller, 1775)
Apatura metis Freyer, 1829
Aphantopus hyperantus (Linnaeus, 1758)
Arethusana arethusa (Denis & Schiffermüller, 1775)
Argynnis pandora (Denis & Schiffermüller, 1775)
Boloria graeca (Staudinger, 1870)
Boloria pales (Denis & Schiffermüller, 1775)
Boloria dia (Linnaeus, 1767)
Boloria euphrosyne (Linnaeus, 1758)
Boloria titania (Esper, 1793)
Brenthis daphne (Bergsträsser, 1780)
Brenthis hecate (Denis & Schiffermüller, 1775)
Brenthis ino (Rottemburg, 1775)
Brintesia circe (Fabricius, 1775)
Charaxes jasius (Linnaeus, 1767)
Chazara briseis (Linnaeus, 1764)
Coenonympha arcania (Linnaeus, 1761)
Coenonympha leander (Esper, 1784)
Coenonympha orientalis Rebel, 1910
Coenonympha pamphilus (Linnaeus, 1758)
Coenonympha tullia (Müller, 1764)
Erebia aethiops (Esper, 1777)
Erebia epiphron (Knoch, 1783)
Erebia euryale (Esper, 1805)
Erebia gorge (Hübner, 1804)
Erebia ligea (Linnaeus, 1758)
Erebia medusa (Denis & Schiffermüller, 1775)
Erebia melas (Herbst, 1796)
Erebia oeme (Hübner, 1804)
Erebia pandrose (Borkhausen, 1788)
Erebia pronoe (Esper, 1780)
Erebia rhodopensis Nicholl, 1900
Erebia triarius (de Prunner, 1798)
Erebia tyndarus (Esper, 1781)
Euphydryas aurinia (Rottemburg, 1775)
Fabriciana adippe (Denis & Schiffermüller, 1775)
Fabriciana niobe (Linnaeus, 1758)
Hipparchia fagi (Scopoli, 1763)
Hipparchia syriaca (Staudinger, 1871)
Hipparchia statilinus (Hufnagel, 1766)
Hipparchia semele (Linnaeus, 1758)
Hyponephele lupinus (O. Costa, 1836)
Hyponephele lycaon (Rottemburg, 1775)
Issoria lathonia (Linnaeus, 1758)
Kirinia climene (Esper, 1783)
Kirinia roxelana (Cramer, 1777)
Lasiommata maera (Linnaeus, 1758)
Lasiommata megera (Linnaeus, 1767)
Libythea celtis (Laicharting, 1782)
Maniola jurtina (Linnaeus, 1758)
Melanargia galathea (Linnaeus, 1758)
Melanargia larissa (Geyer, 1828)
Melanargia russiae (Esper, 1783)
Melitaea athalia (Rottemburg, 1775)
Melitaea cinxia (Linnaeus, 1758)
Melitaea didyma (Esper, 1778)
Melitaea ornata Christoph, 1893
Melitaea phoebe (Denis & Schiffermüller, 1775)
Melitaea trivia (Denis & Schiffermüller, 1775)
Minois dryas (Scopoli, 1763)
Neptis rivularis (Scopoli, 1763)
Nymphalis antiopa (Linnaeus, 1758)
Nymphalis polychloros (Linnaeus, 1758)
Nymphalis xanthomelas (Esper, 1781)
Pararge aegeria (Linnaeus, 1758)
Polygonia c-album (Linnaeus, 1758)
Polygonia egea (Cramer, 1775)
Pseudochazara anthelea (Hübner, 1824)
Pseudochazara geyeri (Herrich-Schäffer, 1846)
Pyronia cecilia (Vallantin, 1894)
Pyronia tithonus (Linnaeus, 1767)
Satyrus ferula (Fabricius, 1793)
Speyeria aglaja (Linnaeus, 1758)
Vanessa atalanta (Linnaeus, 1758)
Vanessa cardui (Linnaeus, 1758)

Papilionidae
Iphiclides podalirius (Linnaeus, 1758)
Papilio alexanor Esper, 1800
Papilio machaon Linnaeus, 1758
Parnassius apollo (Linnaeus, 1758)
Parnassius mnemosyne (Linnaeus, 1758)
Zerynthia cerisy (Godart, 1824)
Zerynthia polyxena (Denis & Schiffermüller, 1775)

Pieridae
Anthocharis cardamines (Linnaeus, 1758)
Anthocharis gruneri Herrich-Schäffer, 1851
Aporia crataegi (Linnaeus, 1758)
Colias croceus (Fourcroy, 1785)
Colias hyale (Linnaeus, 1758)
Euchloe ausonia (Hübner, 1804)
Gonepteryx cleopatra (Linnaeus, 1767)
Gonepteryx farinosa (Zeller, 1847)
Gonepteryx rhamni (Linnaeus, 1758)
Leptidea duponcheli (Staudinger, 1871)
Leptidea sinapis (Linnaeus, 1758)
Pieris brassicae (Linnaeus, 1758)
Pieris ergane (Geyer, 1828)
Pieris krueperi Staudinger, 1860
Pieris mannii (Mayer, 1851)
Pieris napi (Linnaeus, 1758)
Pieris rapae (Linnaeus, 1758)
Pontia chloridice (Hübner, 1813)
Pontia edusa (Fabricius, 1777)

Riodinidae
Hamearis lucina (Linnaeus, 1758)

Moths

Adelidae
Adela australis (Heydenreich, 1851)
Adela croesella (Scopoli, 1763)
Adela homalella Staudinger, 1859
Adela reaumurella (Linnaeus, 1758)
Adela violella (Denis & Schiffermüller, 1775)
Cauchas fibulella (Denis & Schiffermüller, 1775)
Cauchas leucocerella (Scopoli, 1763)
Cauchas rufifrontella (Treitschke, 1833)
Cauchas rufimitrella (Scopoli, 1763)
Nematopogon adansoniella (Villers, 1789)
Nematopogon pilella (Denis & Schiffermüller, 1775)
Nematopogon robertella (Clerck, 1759)
Nematopogon schwarziellus Zeller, 1839
Nematopogon swammerdamella (Linnaeus, 1758)
Nemophora associatella (Zeller, 1839)
Nemophora barbatellus (Zeller, 1847)
Nemophora congruella (Zeller, 1839)
Nemophora cupriacella (Hübner, 1819)
Nemophora degeerella (Linnaeus, 1758)
Nemophora dumerilella (Duponchel, 1839)
Nemophora fasciella (Fabricius, 1775)
Nemophora metallica (Poda, 1761)
Nemophora minimella (Denis & Schiffermüller, 1775)
Nemophora prodigellus (Zeller, 1853)
Nemophora raddaella (Hübner, 1793)
Nemophora violellus (Herrich-Schäffer in Stainton, 1851)

Alucitidae
Alucita cymatodactyla Zeller, 1852
Alucita grammodactyla Zeller, 1841

Argyresthiidae
Argyresthia pruniella (Clerck, 1759)

Autostichidae
Apatema apolausticum Gozmany, 1996
Apatema mediopallidum Walsingham, 1900
Aprominta designatella (Herrich-Schäffer, 1855)
Donaspastus pannonicus Gozmany, 1952
Dysspastus undecimpunctella (Mann, 1864)
Holcopogon bubulcellus (Staudinger, 1859)
Nukusa cinerella (Rebel, 1941)
Nukusa praeditella (Rebel, 1891)

Blastobasidae
Blastobasis phycidella (Zeller, 1839)

Brachodidae
Brachodes nana (Treitschke, 1834)
Brachodes pumila (Ochsenheimer, 1808)

Brahmaeidae
Lemonia balcanica (Herrich-Schäffer, 1847)
Lemonia taraxaci (Denis & Schiffermüller, 1775)

Bucculatricidae
Bucculatrix bechsteinella (Bechstein & Scharfenberg, 1805)

Chimabachidae
Diurnea fagella (Denis & Schiffermüller, 1775)
Diurnea lipsiella (Denis & Schiffermüller, 1775)

Choreutidae
Anthophila fabriciana (Linnaeus, 1767)
Choreutis nemorana (Hübner, 1799)
Prochoreutis myllerana (Fabricius, 1794)
Prochoreutis stellaris (Zeller, 1847)
Tebenna micalis (Mann, 1857)

Coleophoridae
Coleophora albicostella (Duponchel, 1842)
Coleophora albitarsella Zeller, 1849
Coleophora alcyonipennella (Kollar, 1832)
Coleophora anatipenella (Hübner, 1796)
Coleophora argentula (Stephens, 1834)
Coleophora calycotomella Stainton, 1869
Coleophora chamaedriella Bruand, 1852
Coleophora coarctataephaga Toll, 1961
Coleophora conyzae Zeller, 1868
Coleophora deauratella Lienig & Zeller, 1846
Coleophora follicularis (Vallot, 1802)
Coleophora fuscocuprella Herrich-Schäffer, 1855
Coleophora glaucicolella Wood, 1892
Coleophora gryphipennella (Hübner, 1796)
Coleophora hartigi Toll, 1944
Coleophora insulicola Toll, 1942
Coleophora kuehnella (Goeze, 1783)
Coleophora limosipennella (Duponchel, 1843)
Coleophora lixella Zeller, 1849
Coleophora lusciniaepennella (Treitschke, 1833)
Coleophora lutipennella (Zeller, 1838)
Coleophora maritimella Newman, 1863
Coleophora mayrella (Hübner, 1813)
Coleophora millefolii Zeller, 1849
Coleophora niveicostella Zeller, 1839
Coleophora obviella Rebel, 1914
Coleophora oriolella Zeller, 1849
Coleophora ornatipennella (Hübner, 1796)
Coleophora saturatella Stainton, 1850
Coleophora soffneriella Toll, 1961
Coleophora taeniipennella Herrich-Schäffer, 1855
Coleophora trigeminella Fuchs, 1881
Coleophora trochilella (Duponchel, 1843)
Coleophora variicornis Toll, 1952
Coleophora versurella Zeller, 1849
Coleophora vibicella (Hübner, 1813)
Coleophora vulnerariae Zeller, 1839
Coleophora wockeella Zeller, 1849
Coleophora zelleriella Heinemann, 1854
Metriotes lutarea (Haworth, 1828)

Cosmopterigidae
Cosmopterix pulchrimella Chambers, 1875
Eteobalea isabellella (O. G. Costa, 1836)
Eteobalea serratella (Treitschke, 1833)
Eteobalea sumptuosella (Lederer, 1855)
Hodgesiella rebeli (Krone, 1905)
Pancalia leuwenhoekella (Linnaeus, 1761)
Pancalia nodosella (Bruand, 1851)
Pancalia schwarzella (Fabricius, 1798)
Pyroderces argyrogrammos (Zeller, 1847)
Sorhagenia lophyrella (Douglas, 1846)

Cossidae
Cossus cossus (Linnaeus, 1758)
Dyspessa ulula (Borkhausen, 1790)
Parahypopta caestrum (Hübner, 1808)
Phragmataecia castaneae (Hübner, 1790)
Zeuzera pyrina (Linnaeus, 1761)

Crambidae
Achyra nudalis (Hübner, 1796)
Agriphila brioniellus (Zerny, 1914)
Agriphila inquinatella (Denis & Schiffermüller, 1775)
Agriphila straminella (Denis & Schiffermüller, 1775)
Agriphila tolli (Błeszyński, 1952)
Agriphila tristella (Denis & Schiffermüller, 1775)
Anania crocealis (Hübner, 1796)
Anania funebris (Strom, 1768)
Anania fuscalis (Denis & Schiffermüller, 1775)
Anania hortulata (Linnaeus, 1758)
Anania verbascalis (Denis & Schiffermüller, 1775)
Ancylolomia palpella (Denis & Schiffermüller, 1775)
Ancylolomia tentaculella (Hübner, 1796)
Aporodes floralis (Hübner, 1809)
Cataclysta lemnata (Linnaeus, 1758)
Catoptria acutangulellus (Herrich-Schäffer, 1847)
Catoptria confusellus (Staudinger, 1882)
Catoptria falsella (Denis & Schiffermüller, 1775)
Catoptria kasyi Błeszyński, 1960
Catoptria languidellus (Zeller, 1863)
Catoptria mytilella (Hübner, 1805)
Catoptria pauperellus (Treitschke, 1832)
Catoptria pinella (Linnaeus, 1758)
Chrysocrambus craterella (Scopoli, 1763)
Chrysocrambus linetella (Fabricius, 1781)
Chrysoteuchia culmella (Linnaeus, 1758)
Cornifrons ulceratalis Lederer, 1858
Crambus lathoniellus (Zincken, 1817)
Crambus pascuella (Linnaeus, 1758)
Crambus pratella (Linnaeus, 1758)
Cynaeda dentalis (Denis & Schiffermüller, 1775)
Diasemia reticularis (Linnaeus, 1761)
Diasemiopsis ramburialis (Duponchel, 1834)
Dolicharthria bruguieralis (Duponchel, 1833)
Dolicharthria punctalis (Denis & Schiffermüller, 1775)
Ecpyrrhorrhoe diffusalis (Guenée, 1854)
Ecpyrrhorrhoe rubiginalis (Hübner, 1796)
Elophila nymphaeata (Linnaeus, 1758)
Euchromius superbellus (Zeller, 1849)
Eudonia mercurella (Linnaeus, 1758)
Eudonia petrophila (Standfuss, 1848)
Eudonia phaeoleuca (Zeller, 1846)
Eurrhypis pollinalis (Denis & Schiffermüller, 1775)
Evergestis aenealis (Denis & Schiffermüller, 1775)
Evergestis frumentalis (Linnaeus, 1761)
Evergestis sophialis (Fabricius, 1787)
Heliothela wulfeniana (Scopoli, 1763)
Loxostege aeruginalis (Hübner, 1796)
Loxostege manualis (Geyer, 1832)
Loxostege sticticalis (Linnaeus, 1761)
Mecyna lutealis (Duponchel, 1833)
Mecyna trinalis (Denis & Schiffermüller, 1775)
Mesocrambus candiellus (Herrich-Schäffer, 1848)
Metacrambus carectellus (Zeller, 1847)
Metasia carnealis (Treitschke, 1829)
Metasia ophialis (Treitschke, 1829)
Metasia suppandalis (Hübner, 1823)
Metaxmeste phrygialis (Hübner, 1796)
Metaxmeste schrankiana (Hochenwarth, 1785)
Nomophila noctuella (Denis & Schiffermüller, 1775)
Orenaia alpestralis (Fabricius, 1787)
Ostrinia nubilalis (Hübner, 1796)
Ostrinia quadripunctalis (Denis & Schiffermüller, 1775)
Paratalanta hyalinalis (Hübner, 1796)
Paratalanta pandalis (Hübner, 1825)
Pediasia contaminella (Hübner, 1796)
Pediasia luteella (Denis & Schiffermüller, 1775)
Platytes cerussella (Denis & Schiffermüller, 1775)
Pleuroptya ruralis (Scopoli, 1763)
Psammotis pulveralis (Hübner, 1796)
Pyrausta aerealis (Hübner, 1793)
Pyrausta aurata (Scopoli, 1763)
Pyrausta castalis Treitschke, 1829
Pyrausta cingulata (Linnaeus, 1758)
Pyrausta coracinalis Leraut, 1982
Pyrausta despicata (Scopoli, 1763)
Pyrausta nigrata (Scopoli, 1763)
Pyrausta obfuscata (Scopoli, 1763)
Pyrausta purpuralis (Linnaeus, 1758)
Pyrausta sanguinalis (Linnaeus, 1767)
Pyrausta virginalis Duponchel, 1832
Scoparia ingratella (Zeller, 1846)
Scoparia manifestella (Herrich-Schäffer, 1848)
Scoparia pyralella (Denis & Schiffermüller, 1775)
Scoparia subfusca Haworth, 1811
Sitochroa palealis (Denis & Schiffermüller, 1775)
Sitochroa verticalis (Linnaeus, 1758)
Thisanotia chrysonuchella (Scopoli, 1763)
Udea alpinalis (Denis & Schiffermüller, 1775)
Udea austriacalis (Herrich-Schäffer, 1851)
Udea decrepitalis (Herrich-Schäffer, 1848)
Udea ferrugalis (Hübner, 1796)
Udea fulvalis (Hübner, 1809)
Udea languidalis (Eversmann, 1842)
Udea lutealis (Hübner, 1809)
Udea olivalis (Denis & Schiffermüller, 1775)
Udea rhododendronalis (Duponchel, 1834)
Udea uliginosalis (Stephens, 1834)
Xanthocrambus saxonellus (Zincken, 1821)

Douglasiidae
Tinagma perdicella Zeller, 1839

Drepanidae
Cilix glaucata (Scopoli, 1763)
Habrosyne pyritoides (Hufnagel, 1766)
Ochropacha duplaris (Linnaeus, 1761)
Polyploca ridens (Fabricius, 1787)
Tethea ocularis (Linnaeus, 1767)
Watsonalla cultraria (Fabricius, 1775)

Elachistidae
Agonopterix alstromeriana (Clerck, 1759)
Agonopterix assimilella (Treitschke, 1832)
Agonopterix capreolella (Zeller, 1839)
Agonopterix carduella (Hübner, 1817)
Agonopterix cnicella (Treitschke, 1832)
Agonopterix curvipunctosa (Haworth, 1811)
Agonopterix doronicella (Wocke, 1849)
Agonopterix furvella (Treitschke, 1832)
Agonopterix kaekeritziana (Linnaeus, 1767)
Agonopterix nervosa (Haworth, 1811)
Agonopterix pallorella (Zeller, 1839)
Agonopterix propinquella (Treitschke, 1835)
Agonopterix purpurea (Haworth, 1811)
Agonopterix subpropinquella (Stainton, 1849)
Agonopterix yeatiana (Fabricius, 1781)
Blastodacna atra (Haworth, 1828)
Depressaria absynthiella Herrich-Schäffer, 1865
Depressaria beckmanni Heinemann, 1870
Depressaria daucella (Denis & Schiffermüller, 1775)
Depressaria depressana (Fabricius, 1775)
Depressaria douglasella Stainton, 1849
Depressaria pentheri Rebel, 1904
Dystebenna stephensi (Stainton, 1849)
Elachista stenopterella Rebel, 1932
Ethmia aurifluella (Hübner, 1810)
Ethmia bipunctella (Fabricius, 1775)
Ethmia chrysopyga (Zeller, 1844)
Ethmia flavianella (Treitschke, 1832)
Ethmia haemorrhoidella (Eversmann, 1844)
Ethmia pusiella (Linnaeus, 1758)
Haplochrois albanica (Rebel & Zerny, 1932)
Haplochrois ochraceella (Rebel, 1903)
Heinemannia festivella (Denis & Schiffermüller, 1775)
Heinemannia laspeyrella (Hübner, 1796)
Hypercallia citrinalis (Scopoli, 1763)
Luquetia orientella (Rebel, 1893)
Orophia sordidella (Hübner, 1796)
Telechrysis tripuncta (Haworth, 1828)

Epermeniidae
Epermenia aequidentellus (E. Hofmann, 1867)
Epermenia insecurella (Stainton, 1854)
Epermenia ochreomaculellus (Millière, 1854)
Epermenia pontificella (Hübner, 1796)
Epermenia scurella (Stainton, 1851)
Ochromolopis ictella (Hübner, 1813)

Erebidae
Amata kruegeri (Ragusa, 1904)
Amata phegea (Linnaeus, 1758)
Apopestes spectrum (Esper, 1787)
Arctia festiva (Hufnagel, 1766)
Arctia villica (Linnaeus, 1758)
Arctornis l-nigrum (Müller, 1764)
Autophila dilucida (Hübner, 1808)
Autophila anaphanes Boursin, 1940
Callimorpha dominula (Linnaeus, 1758)
Calliteara pudibunda (Linnaeus, 1758)
Calymma communimacula (Denis & Schiffermüller, 1775)
Calyptra thalictri (Borkhausen, 1790)
Catocala coniuncta (Esper, 1787)
Catocala conversa (Esper, 1783)
Catocala disjuncta (Geyer, 1828)
Catocala diversa (Geyer, 1828)
Catocala elocata (Esper, 1787)
Catocala eutychea Treitschke, 1835
Catocala nupta (Linnaeus, 1767)
Catocala nymphaea (Esper, 1787)
Catocala nymphagoga (Esper, 1787)
Catocala puerpera (Giorna, 1791)
Chelis maculosa (Gerning, 1780)
Clytie syriaca (Bugnion, 1837)
Coscinia cribraria (Linnaeus, 1758)
Coscinia striata (Linnaeus, 1758)
Cybosia mesomella (Linnaeus, 1758)
Cymbalophora pudica (Esper, 1785)
Cymbalophora rivularis (Ménétries, 1832)
Diacrisia sannio (Linnaeus, 1758)
Diaphora luctuosa (Hübner, 1831)
Diaphora mendica (Clerck, 1759)
Drasteria cailino (Lefebvre, 1827)
Dysauxes ancilla (Linnaeus, 1767)
Dysauxes famula (Freyer, 1836)
Dysgonia algira (Linnaeus, 1767)
Dysgonia torrida (Guenée, 1852)
Eilema caniola (Hübner, 1808)
Eilema complana (Linnaeus, 1758)
Eilema costalis (Zeller, 1847)
Eilema depressa (Esper, 1787)
Eilema lurideola (Zincken, 1817)
Eilema lutarella (Linnaeus, 1758)
Eilema palliatella (Scopoli, 1763)
Eilema pygmaeola (Doubleday, 1847)
Eilema sororcula (Hufnagel, 1766)
Eublemma amoena (Hübner, 1803)
Eublemma himmighoffeni (Millière, 1867)
Eublemma minutata (Fabricius, 1794)
Eublemma ostrina (Hübner, 1808)
Eublemma parva (Hübner, 1808)
Eublemma polygramma (Duponchel, 1842)
Eublemma purpurina (Denis & Schiffermüller, 1775)
Euclidia mi (Clerck, 1759)
Euclidia glyphica (Linnaeus, 1758)
Euplagia quadripunctaria (Poda, 1761)
Euproctis chrysorrhoea (Linnaeus, 1758)
Euproctis similis (Fuessly, 1775)
Exophyla rectangularis (Geyer, 1828)
Grammodes bifasciata (Petagna, 1787)
Grammodes stolida (Fabricius, 1775)
Honeyania ragusana (Freyer, 1844)
Hypena lividalis (Hübner, 1796)
Hypena obesalis Treitschke, 1829
Hypena obsitalis (Hübner, 1813)
Hypena palpalis (Hübner, 1796)
Hypena rostralis (Linnaeus, 1758)
Idia calvaria (Denis & Schiffermüller, 1775)
Leucoma salicis (Linnaeus, 1758)
Lithosia quadra (Linnaeus, 1758)
Lygephila pastinum (Treitschke, 1826)
Lygephila viciae (Hübner, 1822)
Lymantria monacha (Linnaeus, 1758)
Metachrostis velox (Hübner, 1813)
Miltochrista miniata (Forster, 1771)
Minucia lunaris (Denis & Schiffermüller, 1775)
Nodaria nodosalis (Herrich-Schäffer, 1851)
Ocneria rubea (Denis & Schiffermüller, 1775)
Odice suava (Hübner, 1813)
Orectis proboscidata (Herrich-Schäffer, 1851)
Paracolax tristalis (Fabricius, 1794)
Parasemia plantaginis (Linnaeus, 1758)
Parocneria terebinthi (Freyer, 1838)
Pechipogo plumigeralis Hübner, 1825
Phragmatobia fuliginosa (Linnaeus, 1758)
Phragmatobia luctifera (Denis & Schiffermüller, 1775)
Phragmatobia placida (Frivaldszky, 1835)
Phytometra viridaria (Clerck, 1759)
Polypogon tentacularia (Linnaeus, 1758)
Rhypagla lacernaria (Hübner, 1813)
Rhyparia purpurata (Linnaeus, 1758)
Rivula sericealis (Scopoli, 1763)
Schrankia costaestrigalis (Stephens, 1834)
Scoliopteryx libatrix (Linnaeus, 1758)
Setina irrorella (Linnaeus, 1758)
Spilosoma lubricipeda (Linnaeus, 1758)
Spilosoma lutea (Hufnagel, 1766)
Trisateles emortualis (Denis & Schiffermüller, 1775)
Tyria jacobaeae (Linnaeus, 1758)
Utetheisa pulchella (Linnaeus, 1758)
Watsonarctia deserta (Bartel, 1902)
Zanclognatha lunalis (Scopoli, 1763)
Zanclognatha zelleralis (Wocke, 1850)
Zebeeba falsalis (Herrich-Schäffer, 1839)
Zekelita antiqualis (Hübner, 1809)

Euteliidae
Eutelia adulatrix (Hübner, 1813)

Gelechiidae
Acompsia cinerella (Clerck, 1759)
Acompsia ponomarenkoae Huemer & Karsholt, 2002
Agonochaetia terrestrella (Zeller, 1872)
Anacampsis obscurella (Denis & Schiffermüller, 1775)
Anacampsis scintillella (Fischer von Röslerstamm, 1841)
Anacampsis timidella (Wocke, 1887)
Anarsia lineatella Zeller, 1839
Apodia bifractella (Duponchel, 1843)
Aproaerema anthyllidella (Hübner, 1813)
Aristotelia decurtella (Hübner, 1813)
Aristotelia subdecurtella (Stainton, 1859)
Aroga velocella (Duponchel, 1838)
Brachmia dimidiella (Denis & Schiffermüller, 1775)
Bryotropha affinis (Haworth, 1828)
Bryotropha desertella (Douglas, 1850)
Bryotropha domestica (Haworth, 1828)
Bryotropha dryadella (Zeller, 1850)
Bryotropha senectella (Zeller, 1839)
Bryotropha similis (Stainton, 1854)
Bryotropha terrella (Denis & Schiffermüller, 1775)
Carpatolechia decorella (Haworth, 1812)
Carpatolechia proximella (Hübner, 1796)
Caryocolum leucomelanella (Zeller, 1839)
Caryocolum marmorea (Haworth, 1828)
Caryocolum proxima (Haworth, 1828)
Chionodes distinctella (Zeller, 1839)
Chrysoesthia drurella (Fabricius, 1775)
Chrysoesthia sexguttella (Thunberg, 1794)
Crossobela trinotella (Herrich-Schäffer, 1856)
Dichomeris acuminatus (Staudinger, 1876)
Dichomeris alacella (Zeller, 1839)
Eulamprotes atrella (Denis & Schiffermüller, 1775)
Eulamprotes unicolorella (Duponchel, 1843)
Filatima spurcella (Duponchel, 1843)
Isophrictis striatella (Denis & Schiffermüller, 1775)
Megacraspedus binotella (Duponchel, 1843)
Megacraspedus dolosellus (Zeller, 1839)
Megacraspedus separatellus (Fischer von Röslerstamm, 1843)
Metzneria aprilella (Herrich-Schäffer, 1854)
Metzneria artificella (Herrich-Schäffer, 1861)
Metzneria intestinella (Mann, 1864)
Metzneria lappella (Linnaeus, 1758)
Metzneria neuropterella (Zeller, 1839)
Metzneria paucipunctella (Zeller, 1839)
Mirificarma cytisella (Treitschke, 1833)
Mirificarma eburnella (Denis & Schiffermüller, 1775)
Mirificarma maculatella (Hübner, 1796)
Mirificarma monticolella (Rebel, 1931)
Monochroa conspersella (Herrich-Schäffer, 1854)
Monochroa sepicolella (Herrich-Schäffer, 1854)
Monochroa tenebrella (Hübner, 1817)
Neofaculta ericetella (Geyer, 1832)
Neofaculta infernella (Herrich-Schäffer, 1854)
Nothris lemniscellus (Zeller, 1839)
Nothris verbascella (Denis & Schiffermüller, 1775)
Pectinophora gossypiella (Saunders, 1844)
Platyedra subcinerea (Haworth, 1828)
Prolita sexpunctella (Fabricius, 1794)
Prolita solutella (Zeller, 1839)
Pseudotelphusa paripunctella (Thunberg, 1794)
Recurvaria nanella (Denis & Schiffermüller, 1775)
Sattleria triglavica Povolny, 1987
Scrobipalpa artemisiella (Treitschke, 1833)
Scrobipalpa obsoletella (Fischer von Röslerstamm, 1841)
Scrobipalpa ocellatella (Boyd, 1858)
Scrobipalpa salinella (Zeller, 1847)
Sitotroga cerealella (Olivier, 1789)
Sophronia humerella (Denis & Schiffermüller, 1775)
Sophronia illustrella (Hübner, 1796)
Sophronia semicostella (Hübner, 1813)
Stenolechia gemmella (Linnaeus, 1758)
Stomopteryx detersella (Zeller, 1847)
Syncopacma taeniolella (Zeller, 1839)
Teleiodes vulgella (Denis & Schiffermüller, 1775)
Teleiopsis diffinis (Haworth, 1828)
Teleiopsis terebinthinella (Herrich-Schäffer, 1856)

Geometridae
Abraxas grossulariata (Linnaeus, 1758)
Agriopis leucophaearia (Denis & Schiffermüller, 1775)
Alcis repandata (Linnaeus, 1758)
Alsophila aceraria (Denis & Schiffermüller, 1775)
Angerona prunaria (Linnaeus, 1758)
Anticollix sparsata (Treitschke, 1828)
Aplasta ononaria (Fuessly, 1783)
Aplocera efformata (Guenée, 1858)
Aplocera plagiata (Linnaeus, 1758)
Aplocera praeformata (Hübner, 1826)
Aplocera simpliciata (Treitschke, 1835)
Ascotis selenaria (Denis & Schiffermüller, 1775)
Aspitates gilvaria (Denis & Schiffermüller, 1775)
Aspitates ochrearia (Rossi, 1794)
Asthena albulata (Hufnagel, 1767)
Bupalus piniaria (Linnaeus, 1758)
Cabera exanthemata (Scopoli, 1763)
Cabera pusaria (Linnaeus, 1758)
Campaea honoraria (Denis & Schiffermüller, 1775)
Campaea margaritaria (Linnaeus, 1761)
Camptogramma bilineata (Linnaeus, 1758)
Camptogramma scripturata (Hübner, 1799)
Carsia lythoxylata (Hübner, 1799)
Casilda antophilaria (Hübner, 1813)
Cataclysme riguata (Hübner, 1813)
Catarhoe putridaria (Herrich-Schäffer, 1852)
Catarhoe rubidata (Denis & Schiffermüller, 1775)
Charissa certhiatus (Rebel & Zerny, 1931)
Charissa obscurata (Denis & Schiffermüller, 1775)
Charissa pullata (Denis & Schiffermüller, 1775)
Charissa variegata (Duponchel, 1830)
Charissa onustaria (Herrich-Schäffer, 1852)
Charissa supinaria (Mann, 1854)
Charissa glaucinaria (Hübner, 1799)
Chiasmia aestimaria (Hübner, 1809)
Chiasmia clathrata (Linnaeus, 1758)
Chlorissa cloraria (Hübner, 1813)
Chlorissa viridata (Linnaeus, 1758)
Chloroclysta siterata (Hufnagel, 1767)
Cidaria fulvata (Forster, 1771)
Cleora cinctaria (Denis & Schiffermüller, 1775)
Cleorodes lichenaria (Hufnagel, 1767)
Cleta filacearia (Herrich-Schäffer, 1847)
Coenotephria ablutaria (Boisduval, 1840)
Colostygia aptata (Hübner, 1813)
Colostygia aqueata (Hübner, 1813)
Colostygia pectinataria (Knoch, 1781)
Colotois pennaria (Linnaeus, 1761)
Cosmorhoe ocellata (Linnaeus, 1758)
Costaconvexa polygrammata (Borkhausen, 1794)
Cyclophora porata (Linnaeus, 1767)
Cyclophora punctaria (Linnaeus, 1758)
Cyclophora suppunctaria (Zeller, 1847)
Cyclophora albiocellaria (Hübner, 1789)
Cyclophora annularia (Fabricius, 1775)
Cyclophora puppillaria (Hübner, 1799)
Cyclophora quercimontaria (Bastelberger, 1897)
Cyclophora ruficiliaria (Herrich-Schäffer, 1855)
Dyscia innocentaria (Christoph, 1885)
Dyscia raunaria (Freyer, 1852)
Ectropis crepuscularia (Denis & Schiffermüller, 1775)
Eilicrinia trinotata (Metzner, 1845)
Ematurga atomaria (Linnaeus, 1758)
Ennomos quercaria (Hübner, 1813)
Entephria cyanata (Hübner, 1809)
Entephria flavicinctata (Hübner, 1813)
Entephria nobiliaria (Herrich-Schäffer, 1852)
Epirrhoe alternata (Müller, 1764)
Epirrhoe galiata (Denis & Schiffermüller, 1775)
Epirrita christyi (Allen, 1906)
Epirrita dilutata (Denis & Schiffermüller, 1775)
Euchoeca nebulata (Scopoli, 1763)
Eucrostes indigenata (de Villers, 1789)
Eumannia oppositaria (Mann, 1864)
Euphyia frustata (Treitschke, 1828)
Eupithecia actaeata Walderdorff, 1869
Eupithecia breviculata (Donzel, 1837)
Eupithecia centaureata (Denis & Schiffermüller, 1775)
Eupithecia cretaceata (Packard, 1874)
Eupithecia cuculliaria (Rebel, 1901)
Eupithecia distinctaria Herrich-Schäffer, 1848
Eupithecia dodoneata Guenée, 1858
Eupithecia druentiata Dietze, 1902
Eupithecia ericeata (Rambur, 1833)
Eupithecia extraversaria Herrich-Schäffer, 1852
Eupithecia extremata (Fabricius, 1787)
Eupithecia gemellata Herrich-Schäffer, 1861
Eupithecia gratiosata Herrich-Schäffer, 1861
Eupithecia gueneata Millière, 1862
Eupithecia haworthiata Doubleday, 1856
Eupithecia icterata (de Villers, 1789)
Eupithecia impurata (Hübner, 1813)
Eupithecia innotata (Hufnagel, 1767)
Eupithecia laquaearia Herrich-Schäffer, 1848
Eupithecia lariciata (Freyer, 1841)
Eupithecia orphnata W. Petersen, 1909
Eupithecia pusillata (Denis & Schiffermüller, 1775)
Eupithecia pyreneata Mabille, 1871
Eupithecia riparia Herrich-Schäffer, 1851
Eupithecia satyrata (Hübner, 1813)
Eupithecia scalptata Christoph, 1885
Eupithecia semigraphata Bruand, 1850
Eupithecia silenata Assmann, 1848
Eupithecia subfuscata (Haworth, 1809)
Eupithecia subumbrata (Denis & Schiffermüller, 1775)
Eupithecia tripunctaria Herrich-Schäffer, 1852
Eupithecia venosata (Fabricius, 1787)
Eupithecia vulgata (Haworth, 1809)
Fagivorina arenaria (Hufnagel, 1767)
Gandaritis pyraliata (Denis & Schiffermüller, 1775)
Gnopharmia stevenaria (Boisduval, 1840)
Gnophos sartata Treitschke, 1827
Gnophos furvata (Denis & Schiffermüller, 1775)
Gnophos obfuscata (Denis & Schiffermüller, 1775)
Gymnoscelis rufifasciata (Haworth, 1809)
Heliomata glarearia (Denis & Schiffermüller, 1775)
Hemistola chrysoprasaria (Esper, 1795)
Horisme calligraphata (Herrich-Schäffer, 1838)
Horisme corticata (Treitschke, 1835)
Horisme tersata (Denis & Schiffermüller, 1775)
Horisme vitalbata (Denis & Schiffermüller, 1775)
Hydriomena impluviata (Denis & Schiffermüller, 1775)
Hylaea fasciaria (Linnaeus, 1758)
Hypomecis punctinalis (Scopoli, 1763)
Idaea albitorquata (Pungeler, 1909)
Idaea aureolaria (Denis & Schiffermüller, 1775)
Idaea aversata (Linnaeus, 1758)
Idaea camparia (Herrich-Schäffer, 1852)
Idaea consanguinaria (Lederer, 1853)
Idaea consolidata (Lederer, 1853)
Idaea degeneraria (Hübner, 1799)
Idaea determinata (Staudinger, 1876)
Idaea deversaria (Herrich-Schäffer, 1847)
Idaea dilutaria (Hübner, 1799)
Idaea dimidiata (Hufnagel, 1767)
Idaea distinctaria (Boisduval, 1840)
Idaea elongaria (Rambur, 1833)
Idaea filicata (Hübner, 1799)
Idaea fuscovenosa (Goeze, 1781)
Idaea humiliata (Hufnagel, 1767)
Idaea infirmaria (Rambur, 1833)
Idaea inquinata (Scopoli, 1763)
Idaea laevigata (Scopoli, 1763)
Idaea metohiensis (Rebel, 1900)
Idaea moniliata (Denis & Schiffermüller, 1775)
Idaea obsoletaria (Rambur, 1833)
Idaea ochrata (Scopoli, 1763)
Idaea ostrinaria (Hübner, 1813)
Idaea pallidata (Denis & Schiffermüller, 1775)
Idaea politaria (Hübner, 1799)
Idaea rubraria (Staudinger, 1901)
Idaea rufaria (Hübner, 1799)
Idaea rusticata (Denis & Schiffermüller, 1775)
Idaea seriata (Schrank, 1802)
Idaea serpentata (Hufnagel, 1767)
Idaea straminata (Borkhausen, 1794)
Idaea subsericeata (Haworth, 1809)
Idaea trigeminata (Haworth, 1809)
Isturgia arenacearia (Denis & Schiffermüller, 1775)
Isturgia roraria (Fabricius, 1776)
Ligdia adustata (Denis & Schiffermüller, 1775)
Lomaspilis marginata (Linnaeus, 1758)
Lycia graecarius (Staudinger, 1861)
Lycia hirtaria (Clerck, 1759)
Lythria cruentaria (Hufnagel, 1767)
Lythria purpuraria (Linnaeus, 1758)
Macaria artesiaria (Denis & Schiffermüller, 1775)
Melanthia procellata (Denis & Schiffermüller, 1775)
Menophra abruptaria (Thunberg, 1792)
Mesotype didymata (Linnaeus, 1758)
Mesotype verberata (Scopoli, 1763)
Microloxia herbaria (Hübner, 1813)
Minoa murinata (Scopoli, 1763)
Nebula achromaria (de La Harpe, 1853)
Nebula nebulata (Treitschke, 1828)
Nychiodes dalmatina Wagner, 1909
Nycterosea obstipata (Fabricius, 1794)
Odezia atrata (Linnaeus, 1758)
Odontopera bidentata (Clerck, 1759)
Opisthograptis luteolata (Linnaeus, 1758)
Orthostixis cribraria (Hübner, 1799)
Pachycnemia hippocastanaria (Hübner, 1799)
Pasiphila rectangulata (Linnaeus, 1758)
Peribatodes correptaria (Zeller, 1847)
Peribatodes rhomboidaria (Denis & Schiffermüller, 1775)
Peribatodes umbraria (Hübner, 1809)
Perizoma albulata (Denis & Schiffermüller, 1775)
Perizoma alchemillata (Linnaeus, 1758)
Perizoma bifaciata (Haworth, 1809)
Perizoma flavofasciata (Thunberg, 1792)
Perizoma incultaria (Herrich-Schäffer, 1848)
Perizoma obsoletata (Herrich-Schäffer, 1838)
Petrophora chlorosata (Scopoli, 1763)
Phaiogramma etruscaria (Zeller, 1849)
Philereme transversata (Hufnagel, 1767)
Protorhoe corollaria (Herrich-Schäffer, 1848)
Protorhoe unicata (Guenée, 1858)
Pseudobaptria bogumilaria (Rebel, 1904)
Pseudopanthera macularia (Linnaeus, 1758)
Pseudoterpna pruinata (Hufnagel, 1767)
Psodos quadrifaria (Sulzer, 1776)
Pungeleria capreolaria (Denis & Schiffermüller, 1775)
Rhodometra sacraria (Linnaeus, 1767)
Rhodostrophia calabra (Petagna, 1786)
Rhodostrophia discopunctata Amsel, 1935
Rhodostrophia vibicaria (Clerck, 1759)
Rhoptria asperaria (Hübner, 1817)
Schistostege decussata (Denis & Schiffermüller, 1775)
Sciadia tenebraria (Esper, 1806)
Scopula confinaria (Herrich-Schäffer, 1847)
Scopula flaccidaria (Zeller, 1852)
Scopula imitaria (Hübner, 1799)
Scopula incanata (Linnaeus, 1758)
Scopula marginepunctata (Goeze, 1781)
Scopula minorata (Boisduval, 1833)
Scopula decorata (Denis & Schiffermüller, 1775)
Scopula immorata (Linnaeus, 1758)
Scopula nigropunctata (Hufnagel, 1767)
Scopula ornata (Scopoli, 1763)
Scopula rubiginata (Hufnagel, 1767)
Scopula submutata (Treitschke, 1828)
Scopula tessellaria (Boisduval, 1840)
Scopula turbulentaria (Staudinger, 1870)
Scotopteryx bipunctaria (Denis & Schiffermüller, 1775)
Scotopteryx chenopodiata (Linnaeus, 1758)
Scotopteryx coarctaria (Denis & Schiffermüller, 1775)
Scotopteryx moeniata (Scopoli, 1763)
Scotopteryx mucronata (Scopoli, 1763)
Selenia lunularia (Hübner, 1788)
Selidosema brunnearia (de Villers, 1789)
Selidosema plumaria (Denis & Schiffermüller, 1775)
Siona lineata (Scopoli, 1763)
Synopsia sociaria (Hübner, 1799)
Thalera fimbrialis (Scopoli, 1763)
Thera cognata (Thunberg, 1792)
Thera juniperata (Linnaeus, 1758)
Thera variata (Denis & Schiffermüller, 1775)
Thetidia smaragdaria (Fabricius, 1787)
Timandra comae Schmidt, 1931
Triphosa dubitata (Linnaeus, 1758)
Triphosa sabaudiata (Duponchel, 1830)
Xanthorhoe fluctuata (Linnaeus, 1758)
Xanthorhoe montanata (Denis & Schiffermüller, 1775)
Xanthorhoe spadicearia (Denis & Schiffermüller, 1775)
Xenochlorodes olympiaria (Herrich-Schäffer, 1852)

Glyphipterigidae
Digitivalva pulicariae (Klimesch, 1956)
Glyphipterix loricatella (Treitschke, 1833)

Gracillariidae
Aspilapteryx limosella (Duponchel, 1843)
Aspilapteryx tringipennella (Zeller, 1839)
Caloptilia alchimiella (Scopoli, 1763)
Caloptilia cuculipennella (Hübner, 1796)
Caloptilia elongella (Linnaeus, 1761)
Caloptilia rhodinella (Herrich-Schäffer, 1855)
Calybites phasianipennella (Hübner, 1813)
Cameraria ohridella Deschka & Dimic, 1986
Euspilapteryx auroguttella Stephens, 1835
Micrurapteryx kollariella (Zeller, 1839)
Parectopa ononidis (Zeller, 1839)
Parornix anglicella (Stainton, 1850)
Parornix fagivora (Frey, 1861)
Phyllonorycter abrasella (Duponchel, 1843)
Phyllonorycter acerifoliella (Zeller, 1839)
Phyllonorycter cavella (Zeller, 1846)
Phyllonorycter cerasicolella (Herrich-Schäffer, 1855)
Phyllonorycter cerasinella (Reutti, 1852)
Phyllonorycter esperella (Goeze, 1783)
Phyllonorycter froelichiella (Zeller, 1839)
Phyllonorycter klemannella (Fabricius, 1781)
Phyllonorycter kuhlweiniella (Zeller, 1839)
Phyllonorycter maestingella (Müller, 1764)
Phyllonorycter quercifoliella (Zeller, 1839)
Phyllonorycter rajella (Linnaeus, 1758)
Phyllonorycter roboris (Zeller, 1839)
Phyllonorycter scitulella (Duponchel, 1843)
Phyllonorycter spinicolella (Zeller, 1846)
Phyllonorycter strigulatella (Lienig & Zeller, 1846)

Heliozelidae
Antispila treitschkiella (Fischer von Röslerstamm, 1843)

Hepialidae
Pharmacis lupulina (Linnaeus, 1758)
Phymatopus hecta (Linnaeus, 1758)
Triodia amasinus (Herrich-Schäffer, 1851)
Triodia sylvina (Linnaeus, 1761)

Heterogynidae
Heterogynis penella (Hübner, 1819)

Incurvariidae
Incurvaria masculella (Denis & Schiffermüller, 1775)
Incurvaria oehlmanniella (Hübner, 1796)
Incurvaria pectinea Haworth, 1828
Incurvaria praelatella (Denis & Schiffermüller, 1775)

Lasiocampidae
Gastropacha quercifolia (Linnaeus, 1758)
Lasiocampa quercus (Linnaeus, 1758)
Lasiocampa grandis (Rogenhofer, 1891)
Lasiocampa trifolii (Denis & Schiffermüller, 1775)
Malacosoma castrensis (Linnaeus, 1758)
Malacosoma neustria (Linnaeus, 1758)
Odonestis pruni (Linnaeus, 1758)
Pachypasa otus (Drury, 1773)
Phyllodesma tremulifolia (Hübner, 1810)
Poecilocampa populi (Linnaeus, 1758)

Lecithoceridae
Homaloxestis briantiella (Turati, 1879)
Lecithocera nigrana (Duponchel, 1836)

Limacodidae
Heterogenea asella (Denis & Schiffermüller, 1775)

Lyonetiidae
Leucoptera malifoliella (O. Costa, 1836)

Lypusidae
Lypusa tokari Elsner, Liska & Petru, 2008
Pseudatemelia flavifrontella (Denis & Schiffermüller, 1775)
Pseudatemelia subochreella (Doubleday, 1859)

Micropterigidae
Micropterix calthella (Linnaeus, 1761)
Micropterix kardamylensis Rebel, 1903
Micropterix myrtetella Zeller, 1850

Millieridae
Millieria dolosalis (Heydenreich, 1851)

Momphidae
Mompha langiella (Hübner, 1796)

Nepticulidae
Ectoedemia hannoverella (Glitz, 1872)
Ectoedemia turbidella (Zeller, 1848)
Ectoedemia groschkei (Skala, 1943)
Stigmella anomalella (Goeze, 1783)
Stigmella aurella (Fabricius, 1775)
Stigmella centifoliella (Zeller, 1848)
Stigmella trimaculella (Haworth, 1828)

Noctuidae
Abrostola agnorista Dufay, 1956
Abrostola tripartita (Hufnagel, 1766)
Abrostola triplasia (Linnaeus, 1758)
Acontia lucida (Hufnagel, 1766)
Acontia trabealis (Scopoli, 1763)
Acontiola lascivalis (Lederer, 1855)
Acontiola moldavicola (Herrich-Schäffer, 1851)
Acronicta aceris (Linnaeus, 1758)
Acronicta psi (Linnaeus, 1758)
Acronicta tridens (Denis & Schiffermüller, 1775)
Acronicta euphorbiae (Denis & Schiffermüller, 1775)
Acronicta orientalis (Mann, 1862)
Acronicta rumicis (Linnaeus, 1758)
Actinotia radiosa (Esper, 1804)
Aedia funesta (Esper, 1786)
Aedia leucomelas (Linnaeus, 1758)
Aegle kaekeritziana (Hübner, 1799)
Aegle semicana (Esper, 1798)
Agrochola lychnidis (Denis & Schiffermüller, 1775)
Agrochola helvola (Linnaeus, 1758)
Agrochola nitida (Denis & Schiffermüller, 1775)
Agrotis bigramma (Esper, 1790)
Agrotis catalaunensis (Millière, 1873)
Agrotis cinerea (Denis & Schiffermüller, 1775)
Agrotis clavis (Hufnagel, 1766)
Agrotis exclamationis (Linnaeus, 1758)
Agrotis ipsilon (Hufnagel, 1766)
Agrotis puta (Hübner, 1803)
Agrotis segetum (Denis & Schiffermüller, 1775)
Agrotis spinifera (Hübner, 1808)
Agrotis trux (Hübner, 1824)
Allophyes oxyacanthae (Linnaeus, 1758)
Amephana dalmatica (Rebel, 1919)
Ammoconia senex (Geyer, 1828)
Amphipyra effusa Boisduval, 1828
Amphipyra pyramidea (Linnaeus, 1758)
Amphipyra tragopoginis (Clerck, 1759)
Anarta melanopa (Thunberg, 1791)
Anarta odontites (Boisduval, 1829)
Anarta stigmosa (Christoph, 1887)
Anarta trifolii (Hufnagel, 1766)
Antitype jonis (Lederer, 1865)
Apamea epomidion (Haworth, 1809)
Apamea furva (Denis & Schiffermüller, 1775)
Apamea illyria Freyer, 1846
Apamea lateritia (Hufnagel, 1766)
Apamea maillardi (Geyer, 1834)
Apamea monoglypha (Hufnagel, 1766)
Apamea platinea (Treitschke, 1825)
Apamea remissa (Hübner, 1809)
Apamea sordens (Hufnagel, 1766)
Apamea sublustris (Esper, 1788)
Apamea syriaca (Osthelder, 1933)
Apamea zeta (Treitschke, 1825)
Aporophyla australis (Boisduval, 1829)
Aporophyla canescens (Duponchel, 1826)
Aporophyla nigra (Haworth, 1809)
Apterogenum ypsillon (Denis & Schiffermüller, 1775)
Atethmia centrago (Haworth, 1809)
Athetis hospes (Freyer, 1831)
Atypha pulmonaris (Esper, 1790)
Autographa gamma (Linnaeus, 1758)
Axylia putris (Linnaeus, 1761)
Brachylomia viminalis (Fabricius, 1776)
Brithys crini (Fabricius, 1775)
Bryophila ereptricula Treitschke, 1825
Bryophila raptricula (Denis & Schiffermüller, 1775)
Bryophila rectilinea (Warren, 1909)
Calamia tridens (Hufnagel, 1766)
Callopistria juventina (Stoll, 1782)
Callopistria latreillei (Duponchel, 1827)
Calophasia lunula (Hufnagel, 1766)
Calophasia opalina (Esper, 1793)
Calophasia platyptera (Esper, 1788)
Caradrina gilva (Donzel, 1837)
Caradrina clavipalpis Scopoli, 1763
Caradrina flavirena Guenée, 1852
Caradrina selini Boisduval, 1840
Caradrina wullschlegeli Pungeler, 1903
Caradrina aspersa Rambur, 1834
Caradrina kadenii Freyer, 1836
Ceramica pisi (Linnaeus, 1758)
Cerapteryx graminis (Linnaeus, 1758)
Cerastis rubricosa (Denis & Schiffermüller, 1775)
Charanyca trigrammica (Hufnagel, 1766)
Charanyca ferruginea (Esper, 1785)
Chersotis cuprea (Denis & Schiffermüller, 1775)
Chersotis fimbriola (Esper, 1803)
Chersotis laeta (Rebel, 1904)
Chersotis multangula (Hübner, 1803)
Chilodes maritima (Tauscher, 1806)
Chloantha hyperici (Denis & Schiffermüller, 1775)
Chrysodeixis chalcites (Esper, 1789)
Condica viscosa (Freyer, 1831)
Conisania luteago (Denis & Schiffermüller, 1775)
Conistra erythrocephala (Denis & Schiffermüller, 1775)
Cornutiplusia circumflexa (Linnaeus, 1767)
Cosmia trapezina (Linnaeus, 1758)
Cosmia diffinis (Linnaeus, 1767)
Cosmia confinis Herrich-Schäffer, 1849
Craniophora ligustri (Denis & Schiffermüller, 1775)
Cryphia fraudatricula (Hübner, 1803)
Cryphia algae (Fabricius, 1775)
Cryphia ochsi (Boursin, 1940)
Ctenoplusia accentifera (Lefebvre, 1827)
Cucullia celsiae Herrich-Schäffer, 1850
Cucullia calendulae Treitschke, 1835
Cucullia lactucae (Denis & Schiffermüller, 1775)
Cucullia scopariae Dorfmeister, 1853
Cucullia tanaceti (Denis & Schiffermüller, 1775)
Cucullia umbratica (Linnaeus, 1758)
Cucullia xeranthemi Boisduval, 1840
Cucullia blattariae (Esper, 1790)
Cucullia verbasci (Linnaeus, 1758)
Deltote pygarga (Hufnagel, 1766)
Denticucullus pygmina (Haworth, 1809)
Diachrysia chrysitis (Linnaeus, 1758)
Diarsia mendica (Fabricius, 1775)
Dichagyris flammatra (Denis & Schiffermüller, 1775)
Dichagyris candelisequa (Denis & Schiffermüller, 1775)
Dichagyris forcipula (Denis & Schiffermüller, 1775)
Dichagyris nigrescens (Hofner, 1888)
Dichagyris renigera (Hübner, 1808)
Dicycla oo (Linnaeus, 1758)
Diloba caeruleocephala (Linnaeus, 1758)
Dypterygia scabriuscula (Linnaeus, 1758)
Elaphria venustula (Hübner, 1790)
Epilecta linogrisea (Denis & Schiffermüller, 1775)
Epimecia ustula (Freyer, 1835)
Epipsilia grisescens (Fabricius, 1794)
Episema glaucina (Esper, 1789)
Eucarta amethystina (Hübner, 1803)
Euchalcia modestoides Poole, 1989
Eugnorisma depuncta (Linnaeus, 1761)
Euplexia lucipara (Linnaeus, 1758)
Eupsilia transversa (Hufnagel, 1766)
Euxoa birivia (Denis & Schiffermüller, 1775)
Euxoa decora (Denis & Schiffermüller, 1775)
Euxoa distinguenda (Lederer, 1857)
Euxoa hastifera (Donzel, 1847)
Euxoa nigricans (Linnaeus, 1761)
Euxoa obelisca (Denis & Schiffermüller, 1775)
Euxoa temera (Hübner, 1808)
Globia algae (Esper, 1789)
Gortyna moesiaca Herrich-Schäffer, 1849
Hada plebeja (Linnaeus, 1761)
Hadena perplexa (Denis & Schiffermüller, 1775)
Hadena caesia (Denis & Schiffermüller, 1775)
Hadena capsincola (Denis & Schiffermüller, 1775)
Hadena compta (Denis & Schiffermüller, 1775)
Hadena confusa (Hufnagel, 1766)
Hadena filograna (Esper, 1788)
Hadena magnolii (Boisduval, 1829)
Hadena vulcanica (Turati, 1907)
Hadena tephroleuca (Boisduval, 1833)
Hecatera bicolorata (Hufnagel, 1766)
Hecatera cappa (Hübner, 1809)
Hecatera dysodea (Denis & Schiffermüller, 1775)
Helicoverpa armigera (Hübner, 1808)
Heliothis nubigera Herrich-Schäffer, 1851
Heliothis peltigera (Denis & Schiffermüller, 1775)
Heliothis viriplaca (Hufnagel, 1766)
Helotropha leucostigma (Hübner, 1808)
Hoplodrina ambigua (Denis & Schiffermüller, 1775)
Hoplodrina blanda (Denis & Schiffermüller, 1775)
Hoplodrina octogenaria (Goeze, 1781)
Hoplodrina respersa (Denis & Schiffermüller, 1775)
Hoplodrina superstes (Ochsenheimer, 1816)
Jodia croceago (Denis & Schiffermüller, 1775)
Lacanobia oleracea (Linnaeus, 1758)
Lacanobia w-latinum (Hufnagel, 1766)
Lamprosticta culta (Denis & Schiffermüller, 1775)
Lasionycta imbecilla (Fabricius, 1794)
Lasionycta proxima (Hübner, 1809)
Leucania comma (Linnaeus, 1761)
Leucania putrescens (Hübner, 1824)
Leucania zeae (Duponchel, 1827)
Macdunnoughia confusa (Stephens, 1850)
Mamestra brassicae (Linnaeus, 1758)
Mesapamea secalella Remm, 1983
Mesapamea secalis (Linnaeus, 1758)
Mesotrosta signalis (Treitschke, 1829)
Mniotype adusta (Esper, 1790)
Mniotype solieri (Boisduval, 1829)
Mormo maura (Linnaeus, 1758)
Mythimna riparia (Rambur, 1829)
Mythimna albipuncta (Denis & Schiffermüller, 1775)
Mythimna congrua (Hübner, 1817)
Mythimna ferrago (Fabricius, 1787)
Mythimna l-album (Linnaeus, 1767)
Mythimna straminea (Treitschke, 1825)
Mythimna turca (Linnaeus, 1761)
Mythimna vitellina (Hübner, 1808)
Mythimna unipuncta (Haworth, 1809)
Mythimna andereggii (Boisduval, 1840)
Mythimna sicula (Treitschke, 1835)
Noctua comes Hübner, 1813
Noctua fimbriata (Schreber, 1759)
Noctua interjecta Hübner, 1803
Noctua interposita (Hübner, 1790)
Noctua janthe (Borkhausen, 1792)
Noctua janthina Denis & Schiffermüller, 1775
Noctua orbona (Hufnagel, 1766)
Noctua pronuba (Linnaeus, 1758)
Noctua tertia Mentzer & al., 1991
Noctua tirrenica Biebinger, Speidel & Hanigk, 1983
Nyctobrya muralis (Forster, 1771)
Ochropleura leucogaster (Freyer, 1831)
Ochropleura plecta (Linnaeus, 1761)
Oligia latruncula (Denis & Schiffermüller, 1775)
Oligia strigilis (Linnaeus, 1758)
Omphalophana anatolica (Lederer, 1857)
Omphalophana antirrhinii (Hübner, 1803)
Opigena polygona (Denis & Schiffermüller, 1775)
Oria musculosa (Hübner, 1808)
Orthosia gothica (Linnaeus, 1758)
Oxytripia orbiculosa (Esper, 1799)
Pachetra sagittigera (Hufnagel, 1766)
Panemeria tenebrata (Scopoli, 1763)
Papestra biren (Goeze, 1781)
Peridroma saucia (Hübner, 1808)
Perigrapha rorida Frivaldszky, 1835
Philareta treitschkei (Frivaldszky, 1835)
Phlogophora meticulosa (Linnaeus, 1758)
Phlogophora scita (Hübner, 1790)
Phyllophila obliterata (Rambur, 1833)
Plusia festucae (Linnaeus, 1758)
Polymixis culoti (Schawerda, 1921)
Polymixis rufocincta (Geyer, 1828)
Polymixis serpentina (Treitschke, 1825)
Polyphaenis sericata (Esper, 1787)
Praestilbia armeniaca Staudinger, 1892
Pyrrhia umbra (Hufnagel, 1766)
Rhyacia simulans (Hufnagel, 1766)
Schinia cardui (Hübner, 1790)
Sesamia cretica Lederer, 1857
Sesamia nonagrioides Lefebvre, 1827
Sideridis reticulata (Goeze, 1781)
Simyra dentinosa Freyer, 1838
Spaelotis ravida (Denis & Schiffermüller, 1775)
Spaelotis senna (Freyer, 1829)
Spodoptera exigua (Hübner, 1808)
Spodoptera littoralis (Boisduval, 1833)
Standfussiana lucernea (Linnaeus, 1758)
Subacronicta megacephala (Denis & Schiffermüller, 1775)
Teinoptera olivina (Herrich-Schäffer, 1852)
Thalpophila matura (Hufnagel, 1766)
Tholera decimalis (Poda, 1761)
Trachea atriplicis (Linnaeus, 1758)
Trichoplusia ni (Hübner, 1803)
Trigonophora flammea (Esper, 1785)
Tyta luctuosa (Denis & Schiffermüller, 1775)
Xanthodes albago (Fabricius, 1794)
Xestia ashworthii (Doubleday, 1855)
Xestia c-nigrum (Linnaeus, 1758)
Xestia triangulum (Hufnagel, 1766)
Xestia castanea (Esper, 1798)
Xestia ochreago (Hübner, 1809)
Xestia xanthographa (Denis & Schiffermüller, 1775)

Nolidae
Bena bicolorana (Fuessly, 1775)
Earias clorana (Linnaeus, 1761)
Earias syriacana Bartel, 1903
Nola squalida Staudinger, 1871
Nycteola revayana (Scopoli, 1772)
Nycteola siculana (Fuchs, 1899)
Pseudoips prasinana (Linnaeus, 1758)

Notodontidae
Cerura vinula (Linnaeus, 1758)
Dicranura ulmi (Denis & Schiffermüller, 1775)
Drymonia dodonaea (Denis & Schiffermüller, 1775)
Drymonia querna (Denis & Schiffermüller, 1775)
Drymonia ruficornis (Hufnagel, 1766)
Furcula bifida (Brahm, 1787)
Furcula furcula (Clerck, 1759)
Harpyia milhauseri (Fabricius, 1775)
Notodonta ziczac (Linnaeus, 1758)
Peridea anceps (Goeze, 1781)
Phalera bucephala (Linnaeus, 1758)
Phalera bucephaloides (Ochsenheimer, 1810)
Pheosia tremula (Clerck, 1759)
Pterostoma palpina (Clerck, 1759)
Ptilodon capucina (Linnaeus, 1758)
Spatalia argentina (Denis & Schiffermüller, 1775)
Thaumetopoea pityocampa (Denis & Schiffermüller, 1775)
Thaumetopoea processionea (Linnaeus, 1758)
Thaumetopoea solitaria (Freyer, 1838)

Oecophoridae
Alabonia staintoniella (Zeller, 1850)
Borkhausenia fuscescens (Haworth, 1828)
Crassa unitella (Hübner, 1796)
Endrosis sarcitrella (Linnaeus, 1758)
Epicallima formosella (Denis & Schiffermüller, 1775)
Fabiola pokornyi (Nickerl, 1864)
Holoscolia homaima Gozmany, 1954
Holoscolia huebneri Koçak, 1980
Kasyniana diminutella (Rebel, 1931)
Minetia labiosella (Hübner, 1810)
Oecophora bractella (Linnaeus, 1758)
Oecophora kindermanni (Herrich-Schäffer, 1854)
Oecophora superior (Rebel, 1918)
Pleurota aristella (Linnaeus, 1767)
Pleurota bicostella (Clerck, 1759)
Pleurota filigerella Mann, 1867
Pleurota planella (Staudinger, 1859)
Pleurota pungitiella Herrich-Schäffer, 1854
Pleurota pyropella (Denis & Schiffermüller, 1775)
Pleurota vittalba Staudinger, 1871
Schiffermuelleria schaefferella (Linnaeus, 1758)

Opostegidae
Pseudopostega crepusculella (Zeller, 1839)

Peleopodidae
Carcina quercana (Fabricius, 1775)

Plutellidae
Eidophasia syenitella Herrich-Schäffer, 1854
Plutella xylostella (Linnaeus, 1758)
Plutella porrectella (Linnaeus, 1758)
Rhigognostis hufnagelii (Zeller, 1839)

Praydidae
Prays fraxinella (Bjerkander, 1784)
Prays oleae (Bernard, 1788)

Prodoxidae
Lampronia rupella (Denis & Schiffermüller, 1775)

Psychidae
Acanthopsyche zelleri (Mann, 1855)
Apterona helicoidella (Vallot, 1827)
Bijugis bombycella (Denis & Schiffermüller, 1775)
Canephora hirsuta (Poda, 1761)
Diplodoma laichartingella Goeze, 1783
Eochorica balcanica (Rebel, 1919)
Epichnopterix plumella (Denis & Schiffermüller, 1775)
Eumasia parietariella (Heydenreich, 1851)
Heliopsychidea graecella (Millière, 1866)
Loebelia crassicornis (Staudinger, 1870)
Megalophanes viciella (Denis & Schiffermüller, 1775)
Montanima predotae Sieder, 1949
Oiketicoides lutea (Staudinger, 1870)
Pachythelia villosella (Ochsenheimer, 1810)
Proutia betulina (Zeller, 1839)
Pseudobankesia macedoniella (Rebel, 1919)
Psyche casta (Pallas, 1767)
Psyche crassiorella Bruand, 1851
Psychidea nudella (Ochsenheimer, 1810)
Ptilocephala plumifera (Ochsenheimer, 1810)
Rebelia sapho (Millière, 1864)
Rebelia surientella (Bruand, 1858)
Sterrhopterix fusca (Haworth, 1809)
Taleporia politella (Ochsenheimer, 1816)
Taleporia tubulosa (Retzius, 1783)
Typhonia ciliaris (Ochsenheimer, 1810)

Pterophoridae
Agdistis bennetii (Curtis, 1833)
Agdistis heydeni (Zeller, 1852)
Agdistis meridionalis (Zeller, 1847)
Agdistis satanas Millière, 1875
Agdistis tamaricis (Zeller, 1847)
Amblyptilia acanthadactyla (Hübner, 1813)
Amblyptilia punctidactyla (Haworth, 1811)
Buszkoiana capnodactylus (Zeller, 1841)
Capperia celeusi (Frey, 1886)
Cnaemidophorus rhododactyla (Denis & Schiffermüller, 1775)
Crombrugghia distans (Zeller, 1847)
Crombrugghia laetus (Zeller, 1847)
Emmelina monodactyla (Linnaeus, 1758)
Gillmeria ochrodactyla (Denis & Schiffermüller, 1775)
Hellinsia carphodactyla (Hübner, 1813)
Merrifieldia baliodactylus (Zeller, 1841)
Merrifieldia leucodactyla (Denis & Schiffermüller, 1775)
Merrifieldia malacodactylus (Zeller, 1847)
Merrifieldia tridactyla (Linnaeus, 1758)
Oxyptilus parvidactyla (Haworth, 1811)
Paraplatyptilia metzneri (Zeller, 1841)
Platyptilia farfarellus Zeller, 1867
Pterophorus ischnodactyla (Treitschke, 1835)
Pterophorus pentadactyla (Linnaeus, 1758)
Stangeia siceliota (Zeller, 1847)
Stenoptilia bipunctidactyla (Scopoli, 1763)
Stenoptilia coprodactylus (Stainton, 1851)
Stenoptilia graphodactyla (Treitschke, 1833)
Stenoptilia lutescens (Herrich-Schäffer, 1855)
Stenoptilia pterodactyla (Linnaeus, 1761)
Stenoptilia stigmatodactylus (Zeller, 1852)
Stenoptilia zophodactylus (Duponchel, 1840)

Pyralidae
Acrobasis advenella (Zincken, 1818)
Acrobasis dulcella (Zeller, 1848)
Acrobasis marmorea (Haworth, 1811)
Acrobasis obliqua (Zeller, 1847)
Acrobasis sodalella Zeller, 1848
Acrobasis suavella (Zincken, 1818)
Acrobasis tumidana (Denis & Schiffermüller, 1775)
Aglossa caprealis (Hübner, 1809)
Aglossa pinguinalis (Linnaeus, 1758)
Ancylosis cinnamomella (Duponchel, 1836)
Ancylosis imitella Hampson, 1901
Ancylosis oblitella (Zeller, 1848)
Ancylosis roscidella (Eversmann, 1844)
Ancylosis sareptalla (Herrich-Schäffer, 1861)
Aphomia sociella (Linnaeus, 1758)
Aphomia zelleri de Joannis, 1932
Apomyelois ceratoniae (Zeller, 1839)
Asarta aethiopella (Duponchel, 1837)
Bradyrrhoa confiniella Zeller, 1848
Bradyrrhoa gilveolella (Treitschke, 1832)
Cadra cautella (Walker, 1863)
Cadra figulilella (Gregson, 1871)
Cadra furcatella (Herrich-Schäffer, 1849)
Delplanqueia dilutella (Denis & Schiffermüller, 1775)
Elegia similella (Zincken, 1818)
Ematheudes punctella (Treitschke, 1833)
Endotricha flammealis (Denis & Schiffermüller, 1775)
Ephestia disparella Hampson, 1901
Ephestia elutella (Hübner, 1796)
Ephestia kuehniella Zeller, 1879
Ephestia unicolorella Staudinger, 1881
Ephestia welseriella (Zeller, 1848)
Epischnia illotella Zeller, 1839
Epischnia prodromella (Hübner, 1799)
Episcythrastis tabidella (Mann, 1864)
Etiella zinckenella (Treitschke, 1832)
Eurhodope monogrammos (Zeller, 1867)
Eurhodope rosella (Scopoli, 1763)
Euzophera bigella (Zeller, 1848)
Euzophera cinerosella (Zeller, 1839)
Euzophera lunulella (O. Costa, 1836)
Euzophera pinguis (Haworth, 1811)
Euzopherodes charlottae (Rebel, 1914)
Euzopherodes lutisignella (Mann, 1869)
Euzopherodes vapidella (Mann, 1857)
Gymnancyla canella (Denis & Schiffermüller, 1775)
Gymnancyla hornigii (Lederer, 1852)
Homoeosoma nebulella (Denis & Schiffermüller, 1775)
Homoeosoma nimbella (Duponchel, 1837)
Homoeosoma sinuella (Fabricius, 1794)
Hypochalcia ahenella (Denis & Schiffermüller, 1775)
Hypsopygia costalis (Fabricius, 1775)
Hypsopygia fulvocilialis (Duponchel, 1834)
Hypsopygia glaucinalis (Linnaeus, 1758)
Hypsopygia rubidalis (Denis & Schiffermüller, 1775)
Hypsotropa limbella Zeller, 1848
Khorassania compositella (Treitschke, 1835)
Merulempista cingillella (Zeller, 1846)
Michaeliodes friesei Roesler, 1969
Moitrelia obductella (Zeller, 1839)
Myelois circumvoluta (Fourcroy, 1785)
Pempelia alpigenella (Duponchel, 1836)
Pempelia amoenella (Zeller, 1848)
Pempelia palumbella (Denis & Schiffermüller, 1775)
Pempeliella ornatella (Denis & Schiffermüller, 1775)
Pempeliella sororiella Zeller, 1839
Phycita coronatella (Guenée, 1845)
Phycita meliella (Mann, 1864)
Phycita roborella (Denis & Schiffermüller, 1775)
Phycitodes albatella (Ragonot, 1887)
Phycitodes binaevella (Hübner, 1813)
Phycitodes inquinatella (Ragonot, 1887)
Phycitodes lacteella (Rothschild, 1915)
Plodia interpunctella (Hübner, 1813)
Pterothrixidia rufella (Duponchel, 1836)
Pyralis farinalis (Linnaeus, 1758)
Pyralis regalis Denis & Schiffermüller, 1775
Rhodophaea formosa (Haworth, 1811)
Sciota hostilis (Stephens, 1834)
Seeboldia korgosella Ragonot, 1887
Selagia argyrella (Denis & Schiffermüller, 1775)
Selagia spadicella (Hübner, 1796)
Seleucia pectinella (Chretien, 1911)
Stemmatophora combustalis (Fischer v. Röslerstamm, 1842)
Stemmatophora honestalis (Treitschke, 1829)
Synaphe antennalis (Fabricius, 1794)
Synaphe moldavica (Esper, 1794)
Synaphe punctalis (Fabricius, 1775)

Saturniidae
Saturnia caecigena Kupido, 1825
Saturnia pyri (Denis & Schiffermüller, 1775)

Scythrididae
Scythris albidella (Stainton, 1867)
Scythris albostriata Hannemann, 1961
Scythris bubaniae Walsingham, 1907
Scythris cicadella (Zeller, 1839)
Scythris crassiuscula (Herrich-Schäffer, 1855)
Scythris fallacella (Schlager, 1847)
Scythris flavilaterella (Fuchs, 1886)
Scythris flaviventrella (Herrich-Schäffer, 1855)
Scythris gravatella (Zeller, 1847)
Scythris laminella (Denis & Schiffermüller, 1775)
Scythris limbella (Fabricius, 1775)
Scythris moldavicella Caradja, 1905
Scythris noricella (Zeller, 1843)
Scythris obscurella (Scopoli, 1763)
Scythris pascuella (Zeller, 1855)
Scythris picaepennis (Haworth, 1828)
Scythris punctivittella (O. Costa, 1836)
Scythris scipionella (Staudinger, 1859)
Scythris seliniella (Zeller, 1839)
Scythris tabidella (Herrich-Schäffer, 1855)
Scythris tergestinella (Zeller, 1855)
Scythris tributella (Zeller, 1847)
Scythris vittella (O. Costa, 1834)

Sesiidae
Bembecia albanensis (Rebel, 1918)
Bembecia ichneumoniformis (Denis & Schiffermüller, 1775)
Bembecia megillaeformis (Hübner, 1813)
Bembecia pavicevici Tosevski, 1989
Bembecia uroceriformis (Treitschke, 1834)
Chamaesphecia aerifrons (Zeller, 1847)
Chamaesphecia alysoniformis (Herrich-Schäffer, 1846)
Chamaesphecia annellata (Zeller, 1847)
Chamaesphecia bibioniformis (Esper, 1800)
Chamaesphecia chalciformis (Esper, 1804)
Chamaesphecia doleriformis (Herrich-Schäffer, 1846)
Chamaesphecia empiformis (Esper, 1783)
Chamaesphecia euceraeformis (Ochsenheimer, 1816)
Chamaesphecia masariformis (Ochsenheimer, 1808)
Chamaesphecia proximata (Staudinger, 1891)
Chamaesphecia schmidtiiformis (Freyer, 1836)
Chamaesphecia tenthrediniformis (Denis & Schiffermüller, 1775)
Paranthrene tabaniformis (Rottemburg, 1775)
Pennisetia hylaeiformis (Laspeyres, 1801)
Pyropteron affinis (Staudinger, 1856)
Pyropteron leucomelaena (Zeller, 1847)
Pyropteron minianiformis (Freyer, 1843)
Pyropteron muscaeformis (Esper, 1783)
Pyropteron triannuliformis (Freyer, 1843)
Sesia apiformis (Clerck, 1759)
Synanthedon andrenaeformis (Laspeyres, 1801)
Synanthedon cephiformis (Ochsenheimer, 1808)
Synanthedon conopiformis (Esper, 1782)
Synanthedon culiciformis (Linnaeus, 1758)
Synanthedon formicaeformis (Esper, 1783)
Synanthedon loranthi (Kralicek, 1966)
Synanthedon myopaeformis (Borkhausen, 1789)
Synanthedon spheciformis (Denis & Schiffermüller, 1775)
Synanthedon spuleri (Fuchs, 1908)
Synanthedon stomoxiformis (Hübner, 1790)
Synanthedon tipuliformis (Clerck, 1759)
Synanthedon vespiformis (Linnaeus, 1761)
Tinthia brosiformis (Hübner, 1813)
Tinthia myrmosaeformis (Herrich-Schäffer, 1846)
Tinthia tineiformis (Esper, 1789)

Sphingidae
Acherontia atropos (Linnaeus, 1758)
Agrius convolvuli (Linnaeus, 1758)
Daphnis nerii (Linnaeus, 1758)
Deilephila elpenor (Linnaeus, 1758)
Deilephila porcellus (Linnaeus, 1758)
Hemaris croatica (Esper, 1800)
Hippotion celerio (Linnaeus, 1758)
Hyles euphorbiae (Linnaeus, 1758)
Hyles livornica (Esper, 1780)
Hyles nicaea (de Prunner, 1798)
Hyles vespertilio (Esper, 1780)
Laothoe populi (Linnaeus, 1758)
Macroglossum stellatarum (Linnaeus, 1758)
Marumba quercus (Denis & Schiffermüller, 1775)
Proserpinus proserpina (Pallas, 1772)
Rethera komarovi (Christoph, 1885)
Smerinthus ocellata (Linnaeus, 1758)
Sphingoneopsis gorgoniades (Hübner, 1819)
Sphinx ligustri Linnaeus, 1758
Sphinx pinastri Linnaeus, 1758

Tineidae
Cephimallota angusticostella (Zeller, 1839)
Crassicornella crassicornella (Zeller, 1847)
Eudarcia granulatella (Zeller, 1852)
Eudarcia kasyi (Petersen, 1971)
Euplocamus anthracinalis (Scopoli, 1763)
Euplocamus ophisus (Cramer, 1779)
Infurcitinea albanica Petersen, 1963
Infurcitinea albicomella (Stainton, 1851)
Infurcitinea banatica Petersen, 1961
Monopis imella (Hübner, 1813)
Monopis laevigella (Denis & Schiffermüller, 1775)
Monopis obviella (Denis & Schiffermüller, 1775)
Morophaga choragella (Denis & Schiffermüller, 1775)
Nemapogon clematella (Fabricius, 1781)
Nemapogon cloacella (Haworth, 1828)
Nemapogon ruricolella (Stainton, 1849)
Nemapogon signatellus Petersen, 1957
Nemapogon variatella (Clemens, 1859)
Neurothaumasia ankerella (Mann, 1867)
Niditinea fuscella (Linnaeus, 1758)
Novotinea klimeschi (Rebel, 1940)
Reisserita relicinella (Herrich-Schäffer, 1853)
Tinea basifasciella Ragonot, 1895
Tinea translucens Meyrick, 1917
Tinea trinotella Thunberg, 1794
Triaxomasia caprimulgella (Stainton, 1851)
Triaxomera parasitella (Hübner, 1796)
Trichophaga tapetzella (Linnaeus, 1758)

Tischeriidae
Coptotriche marginea (Haworth, 1828)
Tischeria ekebladella (Bjerkander, 1795)

Tortricidae
Acleris bergmanniana (Linnaeus, 1758)
Acleris forsskaleana (Linnaeus, 1758)
Acleris holmiana (Linnaeus, 1758)
Acleris literana (Linnaeus, 1758)
Acleris quercinana (Zeller, 1849)
Acleris variegana (Denis & Schiffermüller, 1775)
Aethes bilbaensis (Rossler, 1877)
Aethes flagellana (Duponchel, 1836)
Aethes hartmanniana (Clerck, 1759)
Aethes margaritana (Haworth, 1811)
Aethes margarotana (Duponchel, 1836)
Aethes moribundana (Staudinger, 1859)
Aethes nefandana (Kennel, 1899)
Aethes rutilana (Hübner, 1817)
Aethes smeathmanniana (Fabricius, 1781)
Aethes tesserana (Denis & Schiffermüller, 1775)
Aethes triangulana (Treitschke, 1835)
Aethes williana (Brahm, 1791)
Agapeta hamana (Linnaeus, 1758)
Agapeta largana (Rebel, 1906)
Agapeta zoegana (Linnaeus, 1767)
Aleimma loeflingiana (Linnaeus, 1758)
Ancylis achatana (Denis & Schiffermüller, 1775)
Ancylis apicella (Denis & Schiffermüller, 1775)
Ancylis comptana (Frölich, 1828)
Ancylis tineana (Hübner, 1799)
Ancylis unguicella (Linnaeus, 1758)
Aphelia viburniana (Denis & Schiffermüller, 1775)
Aphelia ferugana (Hübner, 1793)
Archips podana (Scopoli, 1763)
Archips rosana (Linnaeus, 1758)
Archips xylosteana (Linnaeus, 1758)
Bactra furfurana (Haworth, 1811)
Bactra lancealana (Hübner, 1799)
Bactra robustana (Christoph, 1872)
Cacoecimorpha pronubana (Hübner, 1799)
Celypha cespitana (Hübner, 1817)
Celypha lacunana (Denis & Schiffermüller, 1775)
Celypha rivulana (Scopoli, 1763)
Celypha rufana (Scopoli, 1763)
Celypha striana (Denis & Schiffermüller, 1775)
Choristoneura hebenstreitella (Müller, 1764)
Choristoneura murinana (Hübner, 1799)
Clepsis balcanica (Rebel, 1917)
Clepsis consimilana (Hübner, 1817)
Clepsis pallidana (Fabricius, 1776)
Clepsis senecionana (Hübner, 1819)
Cnephasia alticolana (Herrich-Schäffer, 1851)
Cnephasia asseclana (Denis & Schiffermüller, 1775)
Cnephasia communana (Herrich-Schäffer, 1851)
Cnephasia cupressivorana (Staudinger, 1871)
Cnephasia pasiuana (Hübner, 1799)
Cnephasia stephensiana (Doubleday, 1849)
Cnephasia abrasana (Duponchel, 1843)
Cnephasia incertana (Treitschke, 1835)
Cochylidia heydeniana (Herrich-Schäffer, 1851)
Cochylidia implicitana (Wocke, 1856)
Cochylidia subroseana (Haworth, 1811)
Cochylimorpha meridiana (Staudinger, 1859)
Cochylimorpha straminea (Haworth, 1811)
Cochylis epilinana Duponchel, 1842
Cochylis pallidana Zeller, 1847
Cochylis posterana Zeller, 1847
Crocidosema plebejana Zeller, 1847
Cydia conicolana (Heylaerts, 1874)
Cydia duplicana (Zetterstedt, 1839)
Cydia fagiglandana (Zeller, 1841)
Cydia pactolana (Zeller, 1840)
Cydia pomonella (Linnaeus, 1758)
Cydia pyrivora (Danilevsky, 1947)
Cydia succedana (Denis & Schiffermüller, 1775)
Diceratura ostrinana (Guenée, 1845)
Dichrorampha alpinana (Treitschke, 1830)
Dichrorampha cinerosana (Herrich-Schäffer, 1851)
Dichrorampha eximia (Danilevsky, 1948)
Dichrorampha gruneriana (Herrich-Schäffer, 1851)
Dichrorampha heegerana (Duponchel, 1843)
Dichrorampha plumbana (Scopoli, 1763)
Dichrorampha rilana Drenowski, 1909
Eana incanana (Stephens, 1852)
Eana italica (Obraztsov, 1950)
Eana penziana (Thunberg, 1791)
Eana argentana (Clerck, 1759)
Eana canescana (Guenée, 1845)
Enarmonia formosana (Scopoli, 1763)
Endothenia gentianaeana (Hübner, 1799)
Endothenia lapideana (Herrich-Schäffer, 1851)
Endothenia marginana (Haworth, 1811)
Endothenia nigricostana (Haworth, 1811)
Endothenia quadrimaculana (Haworth, 1811)
Epagoge grotiana (Fabricius, 1781)
Epiblema chretieni Obraztsov, 1952
Epiblema cnicicolana (Zeller, 1847)
Epiblema graphana (Treitschke, 1835)
Epiblema hepaticana (Treitschke, 1835)
Epiblema inulivora (Meyrick, 1932)
Epiblema mendiculana (Treitschke, 1835)
Epiblema scutulana (Denis & Schiffermüller, 1775)
Epiblema similana (Denis & Schiffermüller, 1775)
Epiblema sticticana (Fabricius, 1794)
Epiblema turbidana (Treitschke, 1835)
Epinotia abbreviana (Fabricius, 1794)
Epinotia cruciana (Linnaeus, 1761)
Epinotia festivana (Hübner, 1799)
Epinotia tedella (Clerck, 1759)
Epinotia tetraquetrana (Haworth, 1811)
Epinotia thapsiana (Zeller, 1847)
Eucosma albidulana (Herrich-Schäffer, 1851)
Eucosma cana (Haworth, 1811)
Eucosma conformana (Mann, 1872)
Eucosma conterminana (Guenée, 1845)
Eucosma cretaceana (Kennel, 1899)
Eudemis profundana (Denis & Schiffermüller, 1775)
Eulia ministrana (Linnaeus, 1758)
Eupoecilia ambiguella (Hübner, 1796)
Eupoecilia angustana (Hübner, 1799)
Falseuncaria ruficiliana (Haworth, 1811)
Grapholita funebrana Treitschke, 1835
Grapholita caecana Schlager, 1847
Grapholita coronillana Lienig & Zeller, 1846
Grapholita discretana Wocke, 1861
Grapholita fissana (Frölich, 1828)
Grapholita gemmiferana Treitschke, 1835
Grapholita lathyrana (Hübner, 1822)
Grapholita lunulana (Denis & Schiffermüller, 1775)
Grapholita nebritana Treitschke, 1830
Gynnidomorpha minimana (Caradja, 1916)
Gypsonoma aceriana (Duponchel, 1843)
Hedya nubiferana (Haworth, 1811)
Hedya pruniana (Hübner, 1799)
Hedya salicella (Linnaeus, 1758)
Isotrias hybridana (Hübner, 1817)
Lathronympha strigana (Fabricius, 1775)
Lobesia bicinctana (Duponchel, 1844)
Lobesia quaggana Mann, 1855
Neosphaleroptera nubilana (Hübner, 1799)
Notocelia cynosbatella (Linnaeus, 1758)
Notocelia incarnatana (Hübner, 1800)
Notocelia roborana (Denis & Schiffermüller, 1775)
Notocelia tetragonana (Stephens, 1834)
Notocelia trimaculana (Haworth, 1811)
Notocelia uddmanniana (Linnaeus, 1758)
Olethreutes arcuella (Clerck, 1759)
Orthotaenia undulana (Denis & Schiffermüller, 1775)
Pammene albuginana (Guenée, 1845)
Pammene obscurana (Stephens, 1834)
Pammene rhediella (Clerck, 1759)
Pandemis cerasana (Hübner, 1786)
Pandemis heparana (Denis & Schiffermüller, 1775)
Paramesia gnomana (Clerck, 1759)
Pelochrista caecimaculana (Hübner, 1799)
Pelochrista fusculana (Zeller, 1847)
Pelochrista modicana (Zeller, 1847)
Phalonidia affinitana (Douglas, 1846)
Phalonidia contractana (Zeller, 1847)
Phalonidia manniana (Fischer v. Röslerstamm, 1839)
Phiaris stibiana (Guenée, 1845)
Phiaris umbrosana (Freyer, 1842)
Phtheochroa drenowskyi (Rebel, 1916)
Phtheochroa duponchelana (Duponchel, 1843)
Phtheochroa frigidana (Guenée, 1845)
Phtheochroa fulvicinctana (Constant, 1893)
Phtheochroa inopiana (Haworth, 1811)
Prochlidonia amiantana (Hübner, 1799)
Propiromorpha rhodophana (Herrich-Schäffer, 1851)
Pseudargyrotoza conwagana (Fabricius, 1775)
Pseudococcyx tessulatana (Staudinger, 1871)
Ptycholoma lecheana (Linnaeus, 1758)
Sparganothis pilleriana (Denis & Schiffermüller, 1775)
Spilonota ocellana (Denis & Schiffermüller, 1775)
Thiodia citrana (Hübner, 1799)
Thiodia trochilana (Frölich, 1828)
Tortrix viridana Linnaeus, 1758
Zeiraphera griseana (Hübner, 1799)
Zeiraphera isertana (Fabricius, 1794)

Yponomeutidae
Kessleria albanica Friese, 1960
Kessleria alpicella (Stainton, 1851)
Kessleria mixta Huemer & Tarmann, 1992
Paraswammerdamia albicapitella (Scharfenberg, 1805)
Paraswammerdamia nebulella (Goeze, 1783)
Scythropia crataegella (Linnaeus, 1767)
Swammerdamia caesiella (Hübner, 1796)
Swammerdamia compunctella Herrich-Schäffer, 1855
Yponomeuta cagnagella (Hübner, 1813)
Yponomeuta malinellus Zeller, 1838
Yponomeuta padella (Linnaeus, 1758)
Yponomeuta plumbella (Denis & Schiffermüller, 1775)

Ypsolophidae
Ochsenheimeria taurella (Denis & Schiffermüller, 1775)
Ypsolopha albiramella (Mann, 1861)
Ypsolopha alpella (Denis & Schiffermüller, 1775)
Ypsolopha chazariella (Mann, 1866)
Ypsolopha falcella (Denis & Schiffermüller, 1775)
Ypsolopha lucella (Fabricius, 1775)
Ypsolopha minotaurella (Rebel, 1916)
Ypsolopha mucronella (Scopoli, 1763)
Ypsolopha nemorella (Linnaeus, 1758)
Ypsolopha sylvella (Linnaeus, 1767)
Ypsolopha ustella (Clerck, 1759)

Zygaenidae
Adscita albanica (Naufock, 1926)
Adscita geryon (Hübner, 1813)
Adscita obscura (Zeller, 1847)
Adscita statices (Linnaeus, 1758)
Adscita mannii (Lederer, 1853)
Jordanita chloros (Hübner, 1813)
Jordanita globulariae (Hübner, 1793)
Jordanita graeca (Jordan, 1907)
Jordanita subsolana (Staudinger, 1862)
Jordanita budensis (Ad. & Au. Speyer, 1858)
Jordanita notata (Zeller, 1847)
Rhagades pruni (Denis & Schiffermüller, 1775)
Theresimima ampellophaga (Bayle-Barelle, 1808)
Zygaena carniolica (Scopoli, 1763)
Zygaena brizae (Esper, 1800)
Zygaena laeta (Hübner, 1790)
Zygaena minos (Denis & Schiffermüller, 1775)
Zygaena punctum Ochsenheimer, 1808
Zygaena purpuralis (Brunnich, 1763)
Zygaena angelicae Ochsenheimer, 1808
Zygaena ephialtes (Linnaeus, 1767)
Zygaena exulans (Hohenwarth, 1792)
Zygaena filipendulae (Linnaeus, 1758)
Zygaena lonicerae (Scheven, 1777)
Zygaena loti (Denis & Schiffermüller, 1775)
Zygaena osterodensis Reiss, 1921
Zygaena viciae (Denis & Schiffermüller, 1775)

External links
Fauna Europaea
Martina Šašić, Miloš Popović, Sylvain Cuvelier, Milan Đurić, Filip Franeta, Martin Gascoigne-Pees, Toni Koren, Dirk Maes, Branko Micevski, Nikola Micevski, Morten S. Mølgaard, Chris van Swaay, Irma Wynhoff, Rudi Verovnik. "Contribution to the knowledge of the butterfly fauna of Albania" Nota Lepidopterologica 38(1): 29-45 (4 March 2015) https://doi.org/10.3897/nl.38.8814

Albania
Albania
 Albania
Lepidoptera